Kevin Doyle (born 10 April 1960) is an English actor. He is best known for playing valet/footman Joseph Molesley in the TV series Downton Abbey. He is known for many other roles, including Detective Sergeant (DS) John Wadsworth in Happy Valley, John Parr in the TV series The Lakes, and roles in Coronation Street and The Crimson Field. He is the winner of two Screen Actors Guild awards and a Royal Television Society award for best actor for Happy Valley. He appeared in the Poirot episode “After the Funeral” in 2005 as Inspector Morton.

Credits

Film

Television

Stage
Doyle has worked extensively in theatre, including over 10 productions with the Royal Shakespeare Company (RSC). His credits include:

References

External links

1961 births
Living people
English male stage actors
English people of Irish descent
People from Scunthorpe
Male actors from Lincolnshire
English male television actors
English male film actors
20th-century English male actors
21st-century English male actors